The Port de Lers (or Port de l'Hers or Port de Massat) (elevation ) is a mountain pass in the French Pyrenees in the department of Ariège, between the communities of  Aulus-les-Bains (west), Massat (north) and Vicdessos (east).

Details of climb

At  from the summit is the junction with the climb to the Col d'Agnes.

Appearances in Tour de France
The Port de Lers was first used in the Tour de France in 1995, since when it has featured seven times, most recently in 2022.

References

External links
Profile from Vicdessos
Profile from Massat

Mountain passes of Ariège (department)
Mountain passes of the Pyrenees